Marko Stanković (born 17 February 1986) is an Austrian former professional footballer who played as a central midfielder. He also represented the Austria national team on one occasion in 2008.

Club career
Born in Krems, Austria, Marko Stankovic started his career at DSV Leoben before moving to the Austrian top division side, Sturm Graz. 

He played in the UEFA Champions League for Austria Wien in the 2013–14 season and also recorded an assist against Zenit Saint Petersburg.

Indian Super League
Stankovic signed for Indian Super League side FC Pune City in January 2018 as a mid-season replacement for Robertino Pugliara and played 10 matches in the 2017-18 campaign. The Austrian notched up two goals and three assists for the Stallions in 13 outings last term. 

Later he moved to another Indian side Hyderabad FC.

Later career
In 2020, Stanković has announced his retirement at the age of 33. but later he came back in action with Landesliga Steiermark outfit SV Lebring in the same year.

International career
Stanković appeared for the Austria U21 national team in 20 times between 2004 and 2008 and notched up 6 goals.

He made his international debut for the Austria senior national team on 20 November 2008 against Turkey.

Personal life
Stanković is the son of the former football professional and current coach Dejan Stanković.

Honours
Austria Wien
 Austrian Football Bundesliga: 2012–13
 Austrian Cup runner-up: 2012–13

Austria U17
 U17 European Championship third place: 2003

Individual
 2007: Player of the Year in the Red Zac Erste Liga: 2006–07

References

External links

1986 births
Living people
People from Krems an der Donau
Austrian people of Serbian descent
Footballers from Lower Austria
Austrian footballers
Association football forwards
Austria international footballers
Austrian Football Bundesliga players
2. Liga (Austria) players
Serie B players
Indian Super League players
DSV Leoben players
SK Sturm Graz players
U.S. Triestina Calcio 1918 players
FK Austria Wien players
SV Ried players
FC Pune City players
Hyderabad FC players
Austrian expatriate footballers
Austrian expatriate sportspeople in Italy
Expatriate footballers in Italy
Austrian expatriate sportspeople in India
Expatriate footballers in India